Blake Ochoa (born September 5, 1985)  is a  professional baseball catcher, who played with the Spain national baseball team and is playing with Panathinaikos Baseball.

Ochoa was born in Venezuela and signed as an undrafted free agent by the Florida Marlins in 2005. After starting his career in the Venezuelan Summer League, he was moved by the Marlins to the Gulf Coast League, the Florida State League and the New York–Penn League. He was traded to the Seattle Mariners in 2007 and played with their minor league teams through 2010.

He signed with the Washington Wild Things of the Frontier League in 2011.

He also played for the Spain national baseball team in the 2013 World Baseball Classic., and the 2019 European Baseball Championship. He played for the team at the Africa/Europe 2020 Olympic Qualification tournament, in Italy in September 2019.

References

External links

1985 births
Baseball catchers
Living people
2013 World Baseball Classic players
2019 European Baseball Championship players
Gulf Coast Marlins players
Jupiter Hammerheads players
Jamestown Jammers players
Greensboro Grasshoppers players
Carolina Mudcats players
Everett AquaSox players
Wisconsin Timber Rattlers players
Clinton LumberKings players
Tacoma Rainiers players
High Desert Mavericks players
Washington Wild Things players
Panathinaikos Baseball players
Sportspeople from Maracay